Damar is a neighbourhood in the Lice District of Diyarbakır Province in Turkey.

References

Villages in Lice District